Thomas Fraser may refer to:

Thomas Fraser (Upper Canada politician) (1749–1821), soldier and political figure in Upper Canada
Thomas Fraser, Scot of Clan Frasers of Muchalls, who erected the towerhouse that later became known as Muchalls Castle
Thomas Fraser (singer) (1927–1978), country and western singer from Shetland, Scotland
Thomas Fraser (deacon), first settler of New Glasgow, Nova Scotia
Thomas Fraser (South African cricketer) (1912–1995), South African cricketer
Thomas Fraser (New Zealand cricketer) (1917–1998), New Zealand cricketer
Tom Fraser (1911–1988), British politician
Tommy Fraser (born 1987), English footballer
Thomas Fraser, 10th Lord Lovat, Scottish peer
Thomas Fraser, 12th Lord Lovat (1802–1875), Scottish peer
Thomas Richard Fraser (1841–1920), British physician and pharmacologist
Thomas Fraser (New Zealand politician) (1808–1891), Member of Parliament in Otago, New Zealand
Thomas Fraser (bishop) (1915–1989), bishop of the Episcopal Diocese of North Carolina
Thomas B. Fraser (1860–1925), associate justice of the South Carolina Supreme Court
Thomas E. Fraser (1901–1942), officer in the United States Navy
Thomas H. Fraser, ichthyologist and expert in cardinalfishes
Thomas Fraser, 2nd Lord Lovat (died 1524), Scottish peer
Thomas Fraser, 4th Laird of Lovat, Scottish lord

See also
Thomas Frazer (disambiguation), which includes:
Thomas Frazer (stonemason) (1821–1904), American mason
Thomas Frazer (Auditor General), 2nd Civil Auditor and Accountant General of Ceylon
Tommie Frazier (born 1974), American football player